Anne-Marie Cazalis ( – 30 July 1988) was a French writer, journalist and briefly an actress.

Biography 
She was a friend of Juliette Gréco. Briefly, she had an affair with a little-known cellist, Paul Taylor, and both became emblematic personalities of the Parisian nights of Saint-Germain-des-Prés, where she frequented other writers such as Boris Vian and Jean-Paul Sartre. She later became a journalist and, as a correspondent for Elle magazine. She travelled all around the world. She also participated in a few films and published several essays and novels.

Works

Cinema
 1949: Désordre by Jacques Baratier (short film)
 1950: Le Château de verre by René Clément : the standardiste
 1950: Le Quadrille by Jacques Rivette, with Jean-Luc Godard (short film)
 1966: Le Désordre à vingt ans by Jacques Baratier (documentary)

Theatre
 1951: Le Diable et le Bon Dieu, script by Jean-Paul Sartre, directed by Louis Jouvet, Théâtre Antoine

Books 
 Planh, 10 poèmes de Anne-Marie Cazalis, avec un portrait de l'auteur par Valentine Hugo, Paris, Odette Lieutier, February 1944. Written in French, the work was published in Paris in February 1944 by Odette Lieutier. Still under German occupation, the editor issued only 250 hand-made books. A quadrilingual new edition in French, English, Portuguese and Spanish was published in 2012.
 La Décennie, Fayard, 1972 (novel)
 La Tunisie par-ci par-là, Promotion africaine, Tunisia, 1972
 Kadhafi, le Templier d'Allah, Gallimard, 1974
 Le Cœur au poing, La Table ronde, 1976 (novel)
 Mémoires d'une Anne, Stock, 1976
 1358, La Jacquerie de Paris, le destin tragique du maire Étienne Marcel, Société de production littéraire, 1977
 Les Belles Années, co-written with Anne-Marie Deschodt, Mercure de France, 1978 (novel)

Awards
 1943, Paul-Valéry award for poetry laureate

References

Sources 
 Anne-Marie Cazalis, Mémoires d'une Anne, Stock, 1976
 Boris Vian, Manuel de Saint-Germain-des-Prés, 1951
 Vincent Gille, Saint-Germain-des-Prés, 1945–1950, Paris-Musées, 1989

External links 
 Note about the author at Bibliothèque nationale de France (BnF.fr)
 Anne-Marie Cazalis recites the poem entitled La Liberté in the cave Le Tabou, Paris, 1947 [Video]

1920s births
1988 deaths
20th-century French journalists
French women poets
20th-century French women writers
20th-century French actresses
20th-century French poets
Pieds-Noirs